Calliandra glyphoxylon is a species of plant in the family Fabaceae. It is found only in Ecuador. Its natural habitats are subtropical or tropical moist montane forests and subtropical or tropical dry shrubland.

References

glyphoxylon
Flora of Ecuador
Endangered plants
Taxonomy articles created by Polbot